The 1897 Marshall Thundering Herd football team represented Marshall University in the 1897 college football season. The team did not have a coach, and were outscored by their opponents 6–32 in three games.

Schedule

References

Marshall
Marshall Thundering Herd football seasons
College football winless seasons
Marshall Thundering Herd football